The deep transverse metacarpal ligament (also called the deep transverse palmar ligament) is a narrow fibrous band which runs across the palmar surfaces of the heads of the second, third, fourth and fifth metacarpal bones, connecting them together.

Structure 
The deep transverse metacarpal ligament connects the palmar surfaces of the heads of the second, third, fourth, and fifth metacarpal bones. It is blended with the palmar metacarpophalangeal ligaments.

Its palmar surface is concave where the flexor tendons pass over it. Behind it, the tendons of the interosseous muscles of the hand pass to their insertions.

Clinical significance 
Rarely, the deep transverse metacarpal ligament may rupture.

Additional Images

References

External links
 

Ligaments of the upper limb